Cletus Mathurin (birth April 26, 1982, St Lucia) is a former Saint Lucian cricketer who played for the Saint Lucia national cricket team in Stanford 20/20 in West Indian domestic cricket. He played as a right-handed opening batsman as well as right-arm medium-fast bowler.

References

External links
Player profile and statistics at CricketArchive
Player profile and statistics at ESPNcricinfo

1982 births
Living people
Saint Lucian cricketers
Windward Islands cricketers